Dungeons 2 is a strategy simulation video game developed by Realmforge Studios and published by Kalypso Media. It has been released through retail and on Steam on April 24, 2015. It is the sequel to Dungeons.

Gameplay 
Dungeons 2 is a more direct homage to Dungeon Keeper than its predecessor. The player still takes on the role of the Ultimate Evil, but now as a disembodied spirit after his defeat by heroes of the Overworld. The player must rely on controlling minions with the Hand of Terror. Named minions are hired, and can be leveled up and trained to be more powerful. The player must meet the needs of the minions in order to keep them happy, or they may disobey commands.

The player has to build the dungeon by selecting blocks for the minions to excavate. Rooms can be built onto empty spaces, but blocks can be filled back in as well to wall off an area. Some of the resources like gold and mana are hidden inside stone blocks while some walls cannot be excavated.

A major change from Dungeons is that the Overworld can now be entered through the same cave exits used by heroes who raid the dungeon. Once on the Overworld, the game switches to a real-time strategy mode, allowing the player to command minions as they attack player holdings.  The ultimate goal is usually the destruction of a castle, but there are other separate dungeons holding quests too.

A sarcastic omnipresent narrator narrates the Ultimate Evil's acts of vengeance or inaction, in which case it pushes the player to the right path. Humorous references to games like Dungeon Keeper, Warcraft, and fantasy series like Lord of the Rings and Game of Thrones are commonplace.

Plot 
The story line evolves around the Absolute Evil, fed up with the heroes of the Overworld constantly abusing his minions for experience points and stealing his gold, heads to the surface. Easily conquering the castle, the Evil is ambushed by the assembled heroes of the land and divided into three parts(the Ultimate Evil, the Chaotic Evil, the Corrupting Evil). 
Decades later, one of the Absolute Evil's parts, the Ultimate Evil awakens as a ghostly incorporeal version of himself, and with the aid of loyal minions, starts to rebuild his empire. On the way to punish the individual heroes and gain the alliance of other races, the Ultimate Evil learns of another faction fighting both the heroes and his own empire, the Demons led by the Chaotic Evil. Also appearing and sometimes hindering or helping the Evil are the undead and their enigmatic leader, the Corrupting Evil. The Corrupting Evil is also awakened by absorbing life of Barthas Snow, and leads undead army. The evil prophet leads three Evils to the Stones of Destiny and says that three Evils must be reunited as the Absolute Evil. The Corrupting Evil uses Barthas Snow as sacrifice for ritual of reunifying three Evils and the Absolute Evil is revived. The army of three evils is allied under the control of the Absolute Evil and they totally erase remnants of the Alliance.

Chaotic Evil 
The Chaotic Evil is the Ultimate Evil's archenemy and one of the Absolute Evil's parts. The player must rely on controlling minions with the Hand of Chaos. Named minions can be hired, levelled up and trained to be more powerful. The player must meet the needs of the minions in order to keep them happy, or they may disobey commands. Unlike the Ultimate Evil, Demons rely on magic (the horde relies on strength.) In campaign there are a few levels where the player can control the Demons, though in multiplayer there is always the option of using Demons (The Hand of Chaos controls the demons, as the Hand of Terror controls the Horde).

Reception

Dungeons 2 received "mixed or average" reviews according to review aggregator Metacritic.

Sequel 
Dungeons 3 is the sequel to Dungeons 2. It was released on October 13, 2017.

References

External links 
 

2015 video games
Dungeon management games
Video games with downloadable content
Simulation video games
Fantasy video games
Strategy video games
PlayStation 4 games
Multiplayer and single-player video games
Windows games
Linux games
MacOS games
Video games developed in Germany